Joseph Alston (1779 – September 10, 1816) was the 44th Governor of South Carolina from 1812 to 1814.

Early life and career

The son of William Alston, he was born in All Saints Parish near Georgetown, South Carolina.  Alston attended the College of New Jersey; but he left in 1796 without graduating. He then went to study law at the office of Edward Rutledge and was admitted to the bar. Alston decided against practicing law and instead engaged in planting, becoming one of the wealthiest planters in South Carolina.

In 1801, he married the daughter of Aaron Burr, Theodosia Burr Alston, partly to ingratiate himself with Republican voters in an effort to downplay his aristocratic status. The couple's honeymoon was spent in Niagara Falls, the first recorded couple to do so. Their son Aaron Burr Alston, born 1802, died in 1812.

Political career

Rise to governor
Alston won election to the South Carolina House of Representatives for an 1802–1803 term and later for a more extended period, 1805 to 1812. In 1805, the House of Representatives chose Alston to be the Speaker, and he pushed the legislature to adopt a more equitable basis of representation.

In 1812, the General Assembly elected Alston to be the Governor of South Carolina for a two-year term, after the removal of Thomas Sumter and Andrew Pickens as candidates. Alston's private life suffered tragedy by the loss of his only child and the disappearance of a ship headed towards New York City which his wife had boarded. His troubles continued as his tenure got off to a rocky start and his popularity plummeted.

War of 1812
With the War of 1812 raging, Governor Alston called the state militia into service in 1813, to protect military magazines from the British. Some soldiers of the militia refused to serve, and Alston issued a statement that the refusal of service would result in a death sentence. However, a court issued a writ of habeas corpus, and the men who had been charged with courts-martial were released.

Subsequently, Alston dismissed the entire militia from service; but the residents were in shock that their state was then completely defenseless from British attack. The Governor was forced to recall the militia into service after British forces landed on St. Helena Island, and the South Carolina General Assembly correspondingly increased the powers of the governor for the use of the militia in wartime.

Later life
Alston left the governorship in 1814.  He died in Charleston on September 10, 1816.

References

 Sherman Zavitz (City of Niagara Falls Official Historian), 'Niagara Falls Moment', CJRN 710 Radio, June 26, 2008

External links 
SCIway Biography of Joseph Alston

1779 births
1816 deaths
Princeton University alumni
Members of the South Carolina House of Representatives
Governors of South Carolina
University of South Carolina trustees
Burr family
South Carolina Democratic-Republicans
People from Georgetown, South Carolina
Democratic-Republican Party state governors of the United States